Energy Direct NZ Ltd was a retailer of electricity and gas in New Zealand. It was acquired by Trustpower in mid-2013. Previously it was a trading division of the Wanganui Gas Company Limited, which is wholly owned by the Whanganui District Council.

In 2011, Consumer NZ rated Energy Direct as one of the top power companies in New Zealand, in its annual survey.

The name Energy Direct was also used by the Hutt Valley Electric Power Board (HVEPB) in the early1990s. 

Energy Direct closed in 2016, and its customers were transferred to Trustpower.

See also 

 Electricity sector in New Zealand
 New Zealand electricity market

References

External links 
Energy Direct website

Electric power companies of New Zealand